The Academy of Fine Arts in Helsinki, Finland is part of the University of the Arts Helsinki and provides the highest university-level theoretical and practical training in the country in fine arts.

Academy

The Academy was founded in 1848 by a private foundation called The Art Society of Finland (or Finnish Art Society, or Finnish Art Association) (fi: Suomen Taideyhdistys). At that time the academy was called a Drawing School.    

In 1939 it became The Finnish Art Academy School (fi: Suomen Taideakatemian koulu).

In 1985 it became The Academy of Fine Arts. In the beginning of 1993 the status of the Academy was raised to university level. 3.5 years of full-time study leads to the degree of Bachelor of Fine Arts, and the Master's degree takes two years longer to complete.

In the academic year 2012-2013 the number of students was about 280.

The Academy of Fine Arts can be found at Elimäenkatu 25 A in the neighbourhood of Vallila, northeast of Helsinki center.

Former Students
 Elin Danielson-Gambogi, painter
 Hilda Flodin, painter, sculptor
 Henry Grahn Hermunen, contemporary artist 
 Sini Manninen, painter
 Ebba Masalin, painter, 1892 - 1898
 Eva Ryynänen (1915—2001), sculptor
 Eliel Saarinen, architect, member in 1920
 Tove Jansson, artist, illustrator, and creator of the Moomins

References

External links
 Academy of Fine Arts - Official site

Culture in Helsinki
Universities and colleges in Finland
Education in Helsinki
Art schools in Finland
Educational institutions established in 1848
1848 establishments in Finland